Christopher Leslie Monk (born 1951), is a male retired athlete who competed for Great Britain and England.

Athletics career
Monk became the National Champion in 1973 after winning the British AAA championships in the 200 metres.

He represented England in the sprint events, at the 1974 British Commonwealth Games in Christchurch, New Zealand.

References

1951 births
English male sprinters
Athletes (track and field) at the 1974 British Commonwealth Games
Living people
Commonwealth Games competitors for England
Universiade medalists in athletics (track and field)
Universiade silver medalists for Great Britain